The Grund Formation is a geologic formation in Austria. It preserves fossils dating back to the Langhian stage of the Miocene period.

See also 
 List of fossiliferous stratigraphic units in Austria

References

Further reading 
 G. Daxner-Höck, P. M. Miklas-Tempfer, U. B. Gohlich, K. Huttenen, E. Kazar, D. Nagel, G. E. Roessner, O. Schultz, and R. Ziegler. 2004. Marine and terrestrial vertebrates from the Middle Miocene of Grund (Lower Austria). Geologica Carpathica 55(2):191-197

Geologic formations of Austria
Miocene Series of Europe
Neogene Austria
Langhian
Sandstone formations
Siltstone formations
Deep marine deposits
Shallow marine deposits
Paleontology in Austria